Huntleys Point ferry wharf (also known as Gladesville ferry wharf) is located on the northern side of the Parramatta River serving the Sydney suburb of Huntleys Point. It served by Sydney Ferries Parramatta River services. In 2016 work commenced on the installation of a lift.

Wharves & services

References

External links

 Huntleys Point Wharf at Transport for New South Wales (Archived 12 June 2019)
Huntleys Point Wharf Local Area Map Transport for NSW

Ferry wharves in Sydney